Wait till Your Mother Gets Home! is a 1983 American made-for-television comedy film based on a true story about role reversal and support, starring Paul Michael Glaser and Dee Wallace. The film deals with the popular question of whether or not men and women can successfully take on the other's traditional roles in society, i.e. breadwinner vs. caretaker.

Plot
Robert "Bob" Peters Sr. (Paul Michael Glaser) works as a High School football coach, and physical education teacher to support his family financially while his wife Patricia "Pat" Peters (Dee Wallace) fulfills her full-time duties as a stay-at-home mom. Each day, Pat takes care of their three lovely but lively children by the names of Jennifer (Tamar Howard), Robert Jr. (Robert Jayne), and Christopher (Joseph Lawrence), but still manages to tend to husband Bob's actual needs, and wants, as soon as he comes home from work every day. Now without any gain of support, Pat now has constantly growing frustrations, also is now completely stressed out, and without rest, with the status questioning now in her life are not being helped by her husband Bob finally winning the election for the "Man of the Year Award".

On the night that her husband receives his award, high school principal Herman Ohme (David Doyle) inquires if Pat would be available during the summer months to fill in for another secretary during her leave of absences, but Bob decides for Pat that the last thing she needs is to take on a job outside their home. Feeling her personal development, indeed even her own personal identity, has come to a screeching halt through marriage and parenthood, Pat wants more for herself and informs her husband she's seriously considering taking on the summer job. However, "macho man" Bob feels that all Pat needs are a few lessons in making their household management better to rejuvenate her enthusiasm for her daily tasks. If she'd only keep to a very tight schedule, which means her time of chores, she'd even be able to create some time for herself without the stress, perhaps for a game of tennis. Bob's slightly condescending and non-understanding attitude only to fuel the spark inside Pat to take on a new challenge now outside their home. When Bob is informed that his summer job of driving lessons is cancelled, Pat stands up for herself, and takes on the secretarial job at the school. Since child care costs are too high, Bob then decides to prove to her and makes a bet, that it's an easy job with plenty of time for yourself when you stick to a schedule, takes on the challenge to care for the house and his children, while Pat has her summer job.

Bob takes on his completely "Mister Mom" role or household diva, Bob sets out for the task at hand with vigor, and enthusiasm, as well as a substantial dose of male chauvinism, as he sees it all as the perfect opportunity to prove to his wife just how the household should be run.  He keeps ahead of everything for a few days but eventually finds himself tiring easily and finding the hours of the day vanishing before he achieves half of his household and family care duties. Bob suddenly finds himself polishing tables doing dishes, wiping counters, doing the grocery shopping, and making beds while discovering that her job is not as easy as he thought, now playing nurse to his children. Bob prepares the daily lunch of hamburgers for the kids, of which they soon tire. He even goes to the trouble of preparing breakfast for the family ahead of time at 5:30 a.m., now doing the grocery shopping. Pat, in the meantime, is loving her job and beginning to socialize with her office friends after work, missing a nicely prepared candlelight dinner that Bob has set up. Tired, he does the dishes, and goes to bed. Bob not having any adult contact, now is going jogging with his friend on the beach. On the way he gets a traffic ticket. He takes the kids and Pat to the beach. He puts on the calendar between the days of July and August. The next morning, youngest son Christopher becomes a total brat at the kitchen table resulting in Bob pouring milk all over his head, and making him cry. The washing machine breaks down, and he hovers over the repairman, offering him lunch and trying to make conversation. Bob then apologizes to Christopher for losing his temper, and finds himself sitting the couch drinking a beer.

Summer has finally passed, and it's now Bob's birthday. Pat comes home from work, ready to take Bob out to celebrate when Christopher, after smudging mud on Bob's freshly cleaned window, falls onto Bob's clean white pants as he opens the glass doors. Having enough of household work, Bob loses his temper, and has a fight with Pat, then storms out of the house and disappears. After Pat makes several calls to his friends, she finally receives a call from their local TV station to turn it on. There on the local television show, Bob makes a public apology live on the air and comments about how hard it is to be a homemaker. After Bob leaves the station, he marches down his street with the high school marching band behind him all in salute of Pat, his wife. Later on that day, Bob returns home, apologizes to Pat and shows her his nice clean shirt.

Cast and crew

External links
 
 

1983 television films
1983 films
1983 comedy films
American comedy television films
NBC network original films
1980s American films
1980s English-language films